Wilfred Charles Bleamaster (June 8, 1883 – December 19, 1973) was an American football and basketball coach. He served as the head football coach at Carroll College—now Carroll University—in Waukesha, Wisconsin from 1909 to 1911, Alma College from 1912 to 1915, and the University of Idaho from 1916 to 1917, and Albany College—now known as Lewis & Clark College—from 1926 to 1927. Bleamaster was also the head basketball coach at Alma from 1912 to 1916 and at Idaho for the  season, tallying a career college basketball mark of 

Bleamaster was captain of the football team at Grinnell College in Iowa and graduated in 1908.

Coaching career

Carroll
Bleamaster the eighth head football coach for the Carroll College located in Waukesha, Wisconsin, and he held that position for three seasons, from 1909 until 1911. His coaching record at Carroll was

Alma
Bleamaster was the head football coach at Alma College in Alma, Michigan for four seasons  and compiled a record of

Idaho
Bleamaster went west in 1916 to the University of Idaho in Moscow to become its eighth head football coach and the athletic director. Idaho did not field a football team in 1918, but Bleamaster succeeded Hec Edmundson as head coach of the basketball team for one season. He led Idaho to a  record and a championship in the Pacific Northwest Intercollegiate Conference in 1919, and also led the baseball program for three seasons.

Corvallis High School and Albany College
In August 1924, Bleamaster was hired as athletic director and football coach at Corvallis High School in Corvallis, Oregon. He also coached basketball, baseball, track at Corvallis. In August 1926, Bleamaster moved on to Albany College—now known as Lewis & Clark College—in Albany, Oregon, to take charge of all athletics at the school. He resigned from his post at Albany College after two years.

Late life and death
Bleamaster returned to Corvallis in 1929 and worked as salesman there until 1958. From 1964 to 1969, he lived at the Hotel Benton in Corvallis. Bleamaster later resided with his daughter in Stanford, California. He died after a brief illness, on December 19, 1973, at a convalescent hospital in Los Altos, California.

Head coaching record

College football

References

External links
 

1883 births
1973 deaths
Alma Scots football coaches
Alma Scots men's basketball coaches
Carroll Pioneers football coaches
Carroll Pioneers men's basketball coaches
Grinnell College alumni
Grinnell Pioneers football players
Idaho Vandals athletic directors
Idaho Vandals baseball coaches
Idaho Vandals football coaches
Idaho Vandals men's basketball coaches
Lewis & Clark Pioneers athletic directors
Lewis & Clark Pioneers football coaches
High school baseball coaches in the United States
High school basketball coaches in Oregon
High school football coaches in Oregon
High school track and field coaches in the United States
People from Clinton, Iowa
Coaches of American football from Iowa
Players of American football from Iowa
Baseball coaches from Iowa
Basketball coaches from Iowa